John Rigby (born 25 April 1942) is a British former alpine skier who competed in the 1964 Winter Olympics.

References

External links
 

1942 births
Living people
British male alpine skiers
Olympic alpine skiers of Great Britain
Alpine skiers at the 1964 Winter Olympics